The 1983 ATP Championship, also known as the ATP Championships, was a men's tennis tournament played on outdoor hard courts at the Lindner Family Tennis Center in Mason, Ohio in the United States that was part of the 1983 Volvo Grand Prix. The tournament was held from August 20 through August 26, 1983. Fourth-seeded Mats Wilander won the singles title.

Finals

Singles
 Mats Wilander defeated  John McEnroe 6–4, 6–4
 It was Wilander's 5th singles title of the year and the 9th of his career.

Doubles
 Victor Amaya /  Tim Gullikson defeated  Carlos Kirmayr /  Cássio Motta 6–4, 6–3

References

External links
 
 ITF tournament edition details
 ATP tournament profile

Cincinnati Open
Cincinnati Masters
1983 in American tennis
Cincin